"Let Me Know" is a song by Irish singer Róisín Murphy from her second studio album, Overpowered (2007). The song was written and produced by Murphy and Andy Cato. It was released on 8 October 2007 as the album's second single. "Let Me Know" reached number 28 on the UK Singles Chart, becoming Murphy's highest-peaking solo single to date.

Single cover
The art director of the single was British graphic designer Scott King and the photographer was Jonathan de Villiers. Murphy is depicted wearing a design by English fashion designer Gareth Pugh on the cover.

Critical reception
"Let Me Know" received positive reviews from music critics. While reviewing Overpowered, Mark Edwards of The Sunday Times commented that the song's hook is "strong enough to compensate for the album's duller moments." Nick Levine of Digital Spy gave the song four out of five stars, stating that it "melds propulsive synths, a nineties house piano riff and Murphy's crystalline vocals to create a groove that's harder to resist that a night of passion with Brad or Angelina (or both of them—whatever floats your boat, eh?)." Gemma Hampson wrote for musicOMH that it "retains a bit of that Moloko odd-ness that set the band aside from all the other disco, funk, dance groups around at the same time. Murphy's soft and feminine voice sits well above the '80s bouncy bass and funky electro percussion. It's got a good, retro beat, ruined slightly by the dated fake piano heard all too much in dance in the past 25 years."

Track listings

UK CD 1
"Let Me Know" (Radio Edit) – 3:42
"Sunshine" – 3:06

UK CD 2
"Let Me Know" (Album Version) – 5:10
"Unlovable" – 3:57
"Let Me Know" (Andy Cato Vedra Mix) – 8:16
"Let Me Know" (Joey Negro's Destination Boogie Vocal) – 7:12
"Let Me Know" (Video) – 4:05

UK 7" single
A. "Let Me Know" (Radio Edit) – 3:42
B. "Sunshine" – 3:06

UK 12" single
A1. "Let Me Know" (Album Version) – 5:07
A2. "Let Me Know" (Andy Cato Vedra Mix) – 8:16
B1. "Let Me Know" (Joey Negro's Destination Boogie Vocal) – 7:11
B2. "Cry Baby" (Paul Oakenfold Mix) – 6:32

Digital single
"Let Me Know" (Radio Edit) – 3:41

Digital EP 1
"Let Me Know (Radio Edit) – 3:41
"Sunshine" – 3:07
"Unlovable" – 3:56
"Cry Baby" (Paul Oakenfold Mix) – 6:23

Digital EP 2
"Let Me Know" (Album Version) – 5:09
"Let Me Know" (Oscar the Punk Mix) – 6:08
"Let Me Know" (Andy Cato Vedra Mix) – 8:16
"Let Me Know" (Joey Negro's Original Vibe Mix) – 7:01
"Let Me Know" (Joey Negro's Destination Boogie Club) – 7:12
"Let Me Know" (Joey Negro's Destination Boogie Dub) – 7:45

Digital single – Demo Version
"Let Me Know" (Demo Version) – 4:10

Credits and personnel
Credits adapted from the liner notes of the CD single.

 Róisín Murphy – vocals, production, songwriting
 Dan Carey – mixing
 Andy Cato – engineering, instruments, production, songwriting
 Ill Factor – additional production
 Scott King – art direction, design
 Kevin Rudolf – guitar
 Alexis Smith – studio assistance
 Jonathan de Villiers – photography

Charts

References

External links
 

2007 singles
2007 songs
EMI Records singles
Róisín Murphy songs
Songs written by Andy Cato
Songs written by Róisín Murphy
Nu-disco songs